Orit Gadiesh ( born January 31, 1951) is an Israeli-American corporate strategist and chairperson of management consulting firm Bain & Company.

Biography
Gadiesh was born in Haifa, Israel, in 1951, the daughter of a Berlin-born Israel Defense Forces Colonel Falk Gadiesh and his Ukrainian-born wife Pninah, a nurse. After completing her compulsory service in the IDF, in the office of the Deputy Chief of Staff Ezer Weizman, Gadiesh studied at Hebrew University of Jerusalem, graduating in 1975 with a bachelor's degree in psychology. Gadiesh graduated from Harvard Business School in 1977 in the top 5 percent of her class (Baker Scholar) and was awarded the Brown prize for the most outstanding marketing student.

Forbes has listed her among the world's 100 most powerful women four times since 2004.  A frequent business speaker and journal contributor, Gadiesh is co-author of Lessons from Private Equity Any Company Can Use.

References

Living people
1951 births
Harvard Business School alumni
Israeli business executives
American people of Israeli descent
People from Haifa
Bain & Company
American chairpersons of corporations
21st-century Israeli businesswomen
21st-century Israeli businesspeople
20th-century Israeli businesswomen
20th-century Israeli businesspeople